Fairy Tail is a Japanese manga series written and illustrated by Hiro Mashima that has been translated into various languages and spawned a substantial media franchise. The series follows the adventures of the dragon-slayer Natsu Dragneel, as he is searching for the dragon Igneel and partners with seventeen-year-old celestial wizard Lucy Heartfilia, who joins the titular guild. In Japan, the series has been published by Kodansha in Weekly Shōnen Magazine since the magazine's issue of August 23, 2006 and in tankōbon format since December 15, 2006. The series spans over 320 chapters and 36 volumes.

In North America, Kodansha USA and Random House currently publishes its English language adaptation of the series. The English-language adaptation was originally published by the now-defunct Del Rey Manga beginning in March 2008 and ending with their 12th volume in September 2010. Since then, Kodansha USA and Random House replaced Del Ray with the 13th volume in May 2011, reprinting the earlier 12 volumes under their name, and also publishes them digitally. In Australia and New Zealand, the English volumes are distributed by Random House Australia. Thirty English volumes have been released.



Volume list

References

External links
Official Kodansha Fairy Tail website 
Official Del Rey Fairy Tail website

Chapter 2